State Road 31 (NM 31) is a state highway in the US state of New Mexico. NM 31's southern terminus is by the village of Loving at U.S. Route 285 (US 285), and the northern terminus is at US 62/US 180.

Major intersections

See also

References

031
Transportation in Eddy County, New Mexico